is an actress and a former J-pop singer. The younger sister of singer and actress Miho Nakayama, she released her first single on 2 November 1988; her final release as a J-pop artist was on 1 March 1991. Nakayama was also a member of the short-lived idol groups Nanatsuboshi and Rakutenshi. She is affiliated with Office Muse.

Known for her role of Mayumi Nagamine in Gamera: Guardian of the Universe (1995) and Gamera 3: Revenge of Iris (1999), Shinobu, like her older sister, Miho, started out her career as a musician and became successful when she became part of a music group called Rakutenshi. In the early 1990s Shinobu started a career in acting. She was cast in the Jet Li movie Fist of Legend, a remake of the Bruce Lee film Fist of Fury. Shortly afterwards she got the part of Mayumi Nagamine in Gamera: Guardian of the Universe (1995), revisiting that same role four years later in Gamera 3: Revenge of Iris (1999).

Discography

Studio albums

Compilation albums

Singles

Filmography

Film

Television

References

External links 
 
 
 JMDb profile (in Japanese)
 
 

1973 births
Living people
Japanese actresses
Japanese women pop singers
Japanese idols
Singers from Tokyo
21st-century Japanese singers
21st-century Japanese women singers